Caryocolum junctella is a moth of the family Gelechiidae. It is found from most of Europe (except Ireland, the Netherlands, Croatia, Portugal and possibly Spain and parts of the Balkan Peninsula) east to China and Japan.

The length of the forewings is 4.5–5 mm. The forewings are whitish mottled with greyish brown, particularly at the base, across the middle of the wing and along the dorsum. Adults have been recorded on wing from April to August. They overwinter.

The larvae feed on Cerastium arvense, Cerastium glomeratum, Stellaria graminea and Stellaria media. Young larvae mine the leaves of their host plant. Older larvae live among spun together tips of shoots of the host plant. Larvae can be found from May to early June. They have an apple green body and black head.

References

External links
 

junctella
Moths described in 1851
Moths of Asia
Moths of Europe
Taxa named by John William Douglas